Waldemar Tatarczuk, born in 1964 in Siemiatycze, Poland, lives and works in Lublin, Poland. He is a performance and installation artist, art curator, was the founder and curator of Performance Art Centre in Lublin (1999–2010), director of Galeria Labirynt (Labyrinth Gallery) in Lublin (since 2010). He has been active as a performance artist since 1988. He has taken part in performance art events throughout Europe, North America and Asia including: Infr'action (Paris/France), Navinki (Minsk/Belarus), Asiatopia (Bangkok/Thailand), Open (Beijing/China) KIPAF (Seoul/South Korea), undisclosed territories (Solo/Indonesia), 7a*11d (Toronto/Canada), Differences (Warsaw/Poland), Interakcje (Piotrkow Trybunalski/Poland).
His curatorial projects include: 'Art Kontakt' Performance Art Festival (Lublin/Poland), European Performance Art Festival EPAF (Centre for Contemporary Art, Warsaw/Poland), Performance Arsenal (Arsenal Gallery Bialystok/Poland), 'Open City' Festival of Art in Public Spaces (Lublin/Poland), and Performance Art Days (Kiev and Lviv/Ukraine).

References

1964 births
Living people
Artists from Lublin